Louis S. Kahnweiler (October 14, 1919 – February 26, 2017) was an American real estate investor who co-founded the firm Bennett & Kahnweiler.

Biography
Kahnweiler was born to a Jewish family in Chicago and was raised in the Hyde Park neighborhood. In 1937, he graduated from Hyde Park High School and in 1941 he graduated with a BA in business from Northwestern University.
He served in the U.S. Navy. In 1947, he co-founded with Marshall Bennett the real estate development company Bennett & Kahnweiler. He is known for the development of industrial parks, including Centex Industrial Park in Elk Grove Village, Illinois, in 1957 located to the west of O'Hare airport. Kahnweiler amassed a portfolio of 26 industrial parks around the country. In 1985, he added investment counseling, property management, office brokerage and development to a company better known as a broker of factories and developer of industrial parks. Kahnweiler's firm is now known as Colliers International, after investments by a Toronto-based commercial real estate servicer.

Among Kahnweiler's adages was, "Don't ever become a prisoner of your financial lifestyle"

Philanthropy
Kahnweiler was a life trustee of Roosevelt University. He was president of District 108 School Board in Highland Park, Illinois. He was on the board of directors of Highland Park General Hospital, Exchange National Bank of Chicago and Roosevelt University.

Personal life
In 1948, he married Ruth Markus; they had three children: Nancy Kahnweiler Randall; William Kahnweiler, and Kathy Kahnweiler. He died on February 26, 2017, in Lake Forest, Illinois, of natural causes. Services were held at Mitzvah Memorial Funerals.

References 

 
 
 
 http://articles.chicagotribune.com/1985-10-13/business/8503110117_1_industrial-parks-real-estate-estate-brokerage-firm
 https://www.bisnow.com/chicago/news/commercial-real-estate/My-Story-Marshall-Bennett

External links 
 David Ibata, Self-renewal: Kahnweiler`s Motto, Chicago Tribune, October 13, 1985

1919 births
2017 deaths
Jewish American philanthropists
American real estate businesspeople
Northwestern University alumni
Businesspeople from Chicago
Philanthropists from Illinois
20th-century American businesspeople
20th-century American philanthropists
Hyde Park Academy High School alumni
21st-century American Jews